The Athi short-toed lark (Alaudala athensis) is a species of lark in the family Alaudidae. It is found in southern Kenya and northern Tanzania.

Taxonomy and systematics
The Athi short-toed lark was originally described as belonging to the genus Spizocorys and was then classified as belonging to the genus Calandrella until moved to Alaudala in 2014. Formerly or presently, some authorities consider the Athi short-toed lark as a subspecies of the Somali short-toed lark or of the Mediterranean short-toed lark. Alternate names for the Athi short-toed lark include the Athi lark and Kenya short-toed lark (a name also used by the Damara pink-billed lark).

References

Athi short-toed lark
Birds of East Africa
Athi short-toed lark